Simulation modeling is the process of creating and analyzing a digital prototype of a physical model to predict its performance in the real world. Simulation modeling is used to help designers and engineers understand whether, under what conditions, and in which ways a part could fail and what loads it can withstand. Simulation modeling can also help to predict fluid flow and heat transfer patterns.
It analyses the approximate working conditions by applying the simulation software.

Uses of simulation modeling
Simulation modeling allows designers and engineers to avoid the repeated building of multiple physical prototypes to analyze designs for new or existing parts. Before creating the physical prototype, users can investigate many digital prototypes. Using the technique, they can:
 Optimize geometry for weight and strength
 Select materials that meet weight, strength, and budget requirements
 Simulate part failure and identify the loading conditions that cause them
 Assess extreme environmental conditions or loads not easily tested on physical prototypes, such as earthquake shock load
 Verify hand calculations
 Validate the likely safety and survival of a physical prototype before

Typical simulation modeling workflow
Simulation modeling follows a process much like this:
 Use a 2D or 3D CAD tool to develop a virtual model, also known as a digital prototype, to represent a design.
 Generate a 2D or 3D mesh for analysis calculations. Automatic algorithms can create finite element meshes, or users can create structured meshes to maintain control over element quality.
 Define finite element analysis data (loads, constraints, or materials) based on analysis type (thermal, structural, or fluid). Apply boundary conditions to the model to represent how the part will be restrained during use.
 Perform finite element analysis, review results, and make engineering judgments based on results.

See also
 Comparison of system dynamics software
 Mathematical and theoretical biology
 Operations research
 Power system simulation

References

 The CBS Interactive Business Network
 University of Central Florida, Institute for Simulation and Training
 Winsberg, Eric (2003), Simulated Experiments: Methodology for a Virtual World
 Roger D. Smith: "Simulation: The Engine Behind the Virtual World", eMatter, December 1999
 A. Borshchev, A. Filippov: "From System Dynamics and Discrete Event to Practical Agent-Based Modeling: Reasons, Techniques, Tools", The 22nd International Conference of the System Dynamics Society, July 2004, Oxford, England

External links
 Institute for Simulation and Training, University of Central Florida
 National Center for Simulation
 Simulation Interoperability Standards Organization
 The Society for Modeling and Simulation International (Formerly the Society of Computer Simulation)

Mathematical and quantitative methods (economics)